The Ball State Cardinals men's basketball team is the intercollegiate men's basketball team representing Ball State University. The Cardinals have been competing in men's basketball since the 1920–21 season.  The results for each season are listed below, with MAC conference results beginning in 1975 listed in parentheses next to the overall record.

List of seasons

References

External links

Ball State
 
Ball State Cardinals basketball seasons